The Sacred Heart Pioneers baseball team is a varsity intercollegiate athletic team of Sacred Heart University in Fairfield, Connecticut, United States. The team is a member of the Northeast Conference, which is part of the National Collegiate Athletic Association's Division I. Sacred Heart's first baseball team was fielded in 1966. The Pioneers are coached by Pat Egan, who lead his first season as head coach in 2023.

The program transitioned to NCAA Division I in 2000, and has appeared in the NCAA Division I Baseball Championship four times since the transition.  While at the NCAA Division II level, the Pioneers reached the 1992 Division II College World Series.  The Pioneers have seen fifteen players selected in the Major League Baseball Draft. Former head coach Nick Giaquinto, was the schools all-time winnest coach, having won 631 games in 30 seasons.

Coaching history
Records not available from 1966–74

See also
List of NCAA Division I baseball programs

References

External links
 Official website